Kazimierz Orzeł (born 26 August 1943) is a Polish long-distance runner. He competed in the marathon at the 1976 Summer Olympics.

References

1943 births
Living people
Athletes (track and field) at the 1976 Summer Olympics
Polish male long-distance runners
Polish male marathon runners
Olympic athletes of Poland
People from Nowy Sącz County